The Myall Creek massacre was the killing of at least twenty-eight unarmed Indigenous Australians by twelve colonists on 10 June 1838 at the Myall Creek near the Gwydir River, in northern New South Wales. After two trials, seven of the twelve colonists were found guilty of murder and hanged, a verdict which sparked extreme controversy within New South Wales settler society. One—the leader and free settler John Fleming—evaded arrest and was never tried. Four were never retried following the not guilty verdict of the first trial.

Description of the massacre
A group of eleven stockmen, consisting of assigned convicts and former convicts, ten of them white Europeans, the 11th, John Johnstone, a black African, led by John Henry Fleming, who was from Mungie Bundie Run near Moree, arrived at Henry Dangar's Myall Creek station in New England on 9 June 1838. They rode up to the station huts beside which were camped a group of approximately thirty-five Aboriginal people. They were part of the Wirraayaraay (also spelled 'Weraerai') group who belonged to the Kamilaroi people. They had been camped at the station for a few weeks after being invited by one of the convict stockmen, Charles Kilmeister (or Kilminister), to come to their station for their safety and protection from the gangs of marauding stockmen who were roaming the district slaughtering any Aboriginal people they could find. These Aboriginal people had previously been camped peacefully at McIntyre's station for a few months. They were therefore well known to the whites. Most of them had been given European names such as Daddy, King Sandy, Joey, Martha and Charley. Some of the children spoke a certain amount of English. When the stockmen rode into their camp they fled into the convict's hut pleading for protection.

When asked by the station hut keeper, George Anderson, what they were going to do with the Aboriginal people, John Russell said they were going to "take them over the back of the range and frighten them". The stockmen then entered the hut, tied them to a long tether rope and led them away. They took them to a gully on the side of the ridge about 800 metres to the west of the station huts. There they slaughtered them all except for one woman whom they kept with them for the next couple of days. The approximately 28 people they murdered were largely women, children and old men. Ten younger men were away on a neighbouring station cutting bark. Most of the people were slaughtered with swords as George Anderson, who refused to join the massacre, clearly heard there were just two shots. Unlike Anderson, Charles Kilmeister joined the slaughter.

Testimony was later given at trial that the children had been beheaded while the men and women were forced to run as far as they could between the stockyard fence and a line of sword-wielding stockmen who hacked at them as they passed. After the massacre, Fleming and his gang rode off looking to kill the remainder of the group, who they knew had gone to the neighbouring station. They failed to find the other Aboriginal people as they had returned to Myall that night and left after being warned the killers would be returning. On the party's return to Myall two days later, they dismembered and burnt the bodies before resuming the search for the remaining people. The ten people had gone to MacIntyre's station near Inverell, 40 kilometres to the east, where between 30 and 40 Aboriginal people were reportedly murdered with their bodies being cast onto a large fire. Many suspect this massacre was also committed by the same stockmen. After several days of heavy drinking the party dispersed.

When the manager of the station, William Hobbs, returned several days later and discovered the bodies, counting up to twenty-eight of them (as they were beheaded and dismembered he had difficulty determining the exact number) he decided to report the incident but Kilmeister initially talked him out of it. Hobbs discussed it with a neighbouring station overseer, Thomas Foster, who told squatter Frederick Foot who rode to Sydney to report it to the new Governor, George Gipps. Supported by the Attorney General, John Plunkett, Gipps ordered Police Magistrate Edward Denny Day at Muswellbrook to investigate the massacre.

They carried out a thorough investigation despite the bodies having been removed from the massacre site where only a few bone fragments remained. He arrested eleven of the twelve perpetrators. The only one to escape was the only free man involved, the leader, John Fleming. Anderson was crucial in identifying the arrested men. He had initially refused to name the men involved but after finding out that the massacre had been planned more than a week earlier to coincide with the absence of Hobbs he agreed to identify the killers to the magistrate.

Trials
Beginning on 15 November 1838, the case was heard before the Chief Justice of New South Wales, James Dowling. The accused were represented by three of the colony's foremost barristers, William Foster, William à Beckett and Richard Windeyer, paid for by an association of landowners and stockmen from the Hunter Valley and Liverpool Plains region including Henry Dangar, the owner of the Myall Creek station. The Black Association, as they called themselves, were led by a local magistrate, who apparently used the influence of his office to gain access to the prisoners in Sydney, where he told them to "stick together and say nothing". Not one of the eleven accused gave evidence against their co-accused at the trial, something that Gipps attributes to the magistrate's role.

First trial
R. v. Kilmeister (No. 1) – The station hutkeeper, George Anderson, the only white witness, was the key witness for the prosecution, conducted by Plunkett and Roger Therry as his junior counsel. He told the court how the eleven men had tied the victims together, and led them away. He also said that Edward Foley, one of the perpetrators, had shown him a sword covered with blood. Anderson's testimony was supported by William Hobbs and Magistrate Day, who had conducted the police investigation. The defence's case solely rested on the argument that the bodies could not be identified accurately.

Justice Dowling took care to remind the jury that the law made no distinction between the murder of an Aboriginal person and the murder of a European person. The jury, after deliberating for just twenty minutes, found all eleven men not guilty. A letter to the editor of The Australian on 8 December 1838 alleged that one of the jurors had said privately that although he considered the men guilty of murder, he could not convict a white man of killing an Aboriginal person: "I look on the blacks as a set of monkeys and the sooner they are exterminated from the face of the earth, the better. I knew the men were guilty of murder but I would never see a white man hanged for killing a black." The letter writer did not hear this said himself, but alleged that he had spoken to a second man who told him he had heard a juror say it. The letter writer went on to say, "I leave you, Sir, and the community to determine on the fitness of this white savage to perform the office of a juryman under any circumstance".

Second trial
R. v. Kilmeister (No. 2) – Attorney-General Plunkett however requested the judge to remand the prisoners in custody awaiting further charges from the same incident. Although all eleven were remanded in custody only seven were to face a second trial. The second trial was held on 27 November but only 28 of the 48 called up for jury service turned up; it later came to light that the Black Association had intimidated many into staying away. The trial restarted on 29 November under Justice Burton. Anderson, who had been the key witness at the first trial, gave an even more lucid account of the massacre at the second trial. He told the court that:

While Master was away, some men came on a Saturday, about 10; I cannot say how many days after master left; they came on horseback, armed with muskets and swords and pistols; all were armed ... the blacks, when they saw the men coming, ran into our hut, and the men then, all of them, got off their horses; I asked what they were going to do with the blacks, and Russel said, "We are going to take them over the back of the range, to frighten them".

Anderson then gave evidence that the Aboriginal people in the hut had cried out to him for assistance. He said two women were left behind at the huts, one "because she was good-looking, they said so," and that there was a young child who had been left behind, who attempted to follow her mother (who was tied up with the others), before Anderson carried her back to the hut. There were also two other young boys who had escaped by hiding in the creek.

Anderson also gave evidence about the perpetrators' return and the burning of the bodies.

I [Anderson] saw smoke in the same direction they went; this was soon after they went with the firesticks ... Fleming told Kilmeister to go up by-and-by and put the logs of wood together, and be sure that all [of the remains] was consumed ... the girls they left, and the two boys, and the child I sent away with 10 black fellows that went away in the morning ... I did not like to keep them, as the men might come back and kill them.

Anderson said that he wanted to speak the whole truth at the second trial. He also said that he did not seek to be rewarded for testifying, rather he asked "only for protection". The trial continued until 2 am on 30 November, when the seven men were found guilty. On 5 December they were sentenced to execution by hanging. The sentence was ratified by the Executive Council of New South Wales on 7 December, with Gipps later saying in a report that no mitigating circumstances could be shown for any of the defendants, and it could not be said that any of the men were more or less guilty than the rest. The seven men, Charles Kilmeister, James Oates, Edward Foley, John Russell, John Johnstone, William Hawkins and James Parry, were executed early on the morning of 18 December 1838. The four remaining accused, Blake, Toulouse, Palliser and Lamb, were remanded until the next session to allow time for the main witness against them, an Aboriginal boy named Davey, to be prepared in order to take a Bible oath. It has been claimed that according to the missionary, Lancelot Edward Threlkeld, Henry Dangar had arranged for Davey "to be put out of the way" and he was never seen again; and with Davey unable to be located, the four were discharged in February 1839. However, Threlkeld made no such statement regarding Dangar. What Threlkeld actually wrote about Davey's whereabouts at the time was:
... for Mr Arndell, who was here last week, states that on his recent return from the Gwyder he was informed by a Gentleman that Davey was put out of the way, but whether with his throat cut, or only hid, could not be ascertained.

Further, when the remaining four accused came before the Court on 14 February 1839, Attorney General Plunkett informed the Court:... [Davey] had been under the tuition of a competent person for two months, but it was now reported to [the Attorney General] that he was not so far instructed as to be a competent witness, and it was quite uncertain when he would be; and he [the Attorney General] did not think he should be doing his duty in risking public justice by prosecuting the case without his evidence.

...

I cannot proceed with the trial with any hope of success without [Davey's] evidence ....

In other words, according to Plunkett, in mid-February 1839 Davey was alive and "under tuition", however, Plunkett could not proceed with the case against the remaining accused because of the uncertainty surrounding the time it would take to complete that tuition. It was for this reason that the accused were discharged.

Subsequent events and responses
John Henry Fleming, the leader of the massacre, was never captured. He hid or was protected, either in the Hawkesbury district, on a relative's property inland from Moreton Bay, or in Van Diemen's Land (according to conflicting reports that remain unresolved). He later became a respected farmer, church warden and (ironically) justice of the peace in the Hawkesbury district.

John Blake, one of the four men acquitted at the first trial and not subsequently charged, committed suicide in 1852. One of his descendants believes he did so out of a guilty conscience.

The Myall Creek case led to significant uproar among sections of the population and the press, sometimes voiced in favour of the perpetrators. The Sydney Herald was particularly strident, declaring in October 1838 that "the whole gang of black animals are not worth the money the colonists will have to pay for printing the silly documents on which we have already wasted too much time". This was followed by more violent passage in November 1838 that if Aboriginal Australians, referred to as the "filthy, brutal cannibals of New Holland" and "ferocious savages", attempt to destroy property or kill someone, "do to them as you would do to any white robbers or murderers — SHOOT THEM DEAD."

Not all newspapers or white settlers took the same view, with The Australian publishing a poem by Eliza Hamilton Dunlop, "The Aboriginal Mother" on 13 December 1838 about a week after the seven men were found guilty, but several days before they were hanged. The poem expresses Dunlop's sorrow over the massacre and expresses sympathy for the Aboriginals of Australia. Dunlop responded to criticism by the Sydney Herald, arguing on behalf of the poem and explaining why her views were correct.

The editorial in John Dunmore Lang's newspaper The Colonist on 12 December 1838 argued at length that "the murders... are, to a serious extent, chargeable upon us as a nation".

The Myall Creek massacre is often cited as the only massacre of its kind in colonial Australia for which white people were subsequently executed. However, there is at least one case prior to Myall Creek. In 1820, two convicts, John Kirby and John Thompson, attempted to escape from the colony but were captured by local Aboriginal people and returned to Newcastle. A military party accompanied by two constables set out to meet them and Kirby was seen by the party to stab Burragong (alias King Jack) whereupon he was felled by a waddy. Burragong initially appeared to recover, stating that he was murry bujjery (much recovered) and collected his reward of a "suit of clothing". However, he later complained of illness and died from his wound ten days after being injured. Kirby and Thompson were both tried for "willful murder". All the European witnesses testified that "no blow was struck by any native" before Kirby attacked Burragong. Thompson was acquitted, but Kirby was found guilty and sentenced to death, with his body to be "dissected and anatomised".

The Myall Creek massacre was just the latest of many massacres that took place in that district (the Liverpool Plains) around that time. As elsewhere in the colony, the Aboriginal people at times resisted the expanding invasion of their land by spearing sheep and cattle for food and sometimes attacking the stockmen's huts and killing the white men. In the Liverpool Plains district there had been some cattle speared and huts attacked and two whites murdered (allegedly by Aboriginal people). The squatters complained to Acting Governor Snodgrass, who sent Major James Nunn and about 22 troopers up to the district. Nunn enlisted the assistance of up to 25 local stockmen and together they rode around the district murdering any Aboriginal people they came across. Nunn's campaign culminated in the Waterloo Creek massacre of 1838 at Waterloo Creek. Although no definitive historical records are available, estimates of Aboriginal people murdered range from 40 to over 100.

When Nunn returned to Sydney, many of the local squatters and stockmen continued the "drive" against the Aboriginal people, including the Myall Creek massacre. However, because of community outrage, Governor Gipps did not encourage further prosecutions, including for the earlier Waterloo Creek massacre, nor the later McIntyre's Station massacre, both of which apparently involved a greater number of Aboriginal deaths.

In his book, Blood on the Wattle, travel journalist Bruce Elder says that the successful prosecutions resulted in pacts of silence becoming a common practice to avoid sufficient evidence becoming available for future prosecutions. Another effect, as two Sydney newspapers reported, was that poisoning Aboriginal people became more common as being "much safer". Many massacres went unpunished due to these practices, as what is variously called a 'conspiracy' or 'pact' or 'code' of silence fell over the killings of Aboriginal people.

The Myall Creek massacre and the subsequent trial and hanging of some of the offenders had a profound effect on the "outside" settlers and their dealing with indigenous people throughout all sections the colonial Australian frontiers. The Sydney Herald and the spokesmen for the settlers in the remote districts of New South Wales and Victoria, frequently leading men such as William Wentworth, typically classified the trial and execution of the offenders as "judicial murder". Similar opinions were voiced years later in Queensland, the most populated section of the continent in terms of indigenous people, where it was the subject of numerous statements in the then newly separated parliament. In 1861, there was almost unanimous agreement that the prosecution and hanging in 1838 had been nothing less than '...judicial murder of white men in Sydney', as the government spokesman Robert Ramsay Mackenzie phrased it in his speech in the Legislative Assembly on 25 July, and that 'white troopers were "useless" as they could not be "acting against the blackfellows as they wished, lest an outcry should be raised against them, and they could be prosecuted for murder." ' Arthur Macalister, spokesman for the opposition (later three times Premier of Queensland) agreed, equally using the term "judicial murder". The notion seemingly almost unanimously agreed to by the first Queensland parliament was that no white man should ever be prosecuted in Queensland for the killing of a black.

Stockyard controversy
Over the years there has been some debate over the exact location of the massacre. An oral tradition developed among stockmen who worked on the Myall Creek station, many years after the massacre actually occurred, that it had happened in a stockyard to which the Wirrayaraay were led by the stockmen. Although this oral tradition is very strongly held by some local descendants of the stockmen and others, there is no primary source evidence from the time to support the idea. All the evidence collected by Police Magistrate Edward Denny Day and provided in evidence at the two trials contradicts the suggestion that it occurred in a stockyard. Witnesses William Hobbs, Thomas Foster, Andrew Burrowes and Edward Denny Day himself describe the massacre site without making any mention of a stockyard. Hobbs stated in evidence to the Supreme Court that the stockyard was close to the huts whereas the massacre site was "about half a mile from my house in a westerly direction". Historians dismiss the stockyard as the location of the massacre as a "bush myth".

Memorial

Lyall Munro Snr, a descendant of victims of the massacre, worked long and hard towards getting a memorial erected to mark the event.

It consists of a  walkway, with seven oval-shaped granite boulders along the way, to a 14 tonne granite rock and plaque surrounded by a circle of crushed white granite and edged in by stones from all around the state of New South Wales, overlooking the site of the massacre. In 2001, a group of law students from the University of New England had an excursion to the site where they were welcomed by the Blacklock clan who conducted a smoking ceremony. A ceremony is held each year on 10 June commemorating the victims. The memorial is maintained and funded by the Friends of Myall Creek, an Australian non-profit organisation.

The memorial was vandalised in January 2005, with the words "murder", "women" and "children" chiselled off, in an attempt to make it unreadable.

The Myall Creek Massacre and Memorial Site was included on the Australian National Heritage List on 7 June 2008 and the New South Wales State Heritage Register on 12 November 2010.

The site was again reported as vandalised on 24 September 2021. There was damage to buildings, sandstone steps and railings. A memorial plaque was also vandalised,  but the committee was unsure if this was done by the same perpetrators. Co-chair of the national Friends of Myall Creek committee, Keith Munro, confirmed a racist slogan was also scratched into the ground.

Painting
Sydney artist Ben Quilty created a painting of the massacre, based on a Rorschach ink blot, a technique he had used in previous paintings, entitled Myall Creek Rorschach. He consulted Gamilaraay elders Aunty Sue Blacklock and Uncle Lyall Munro before commencing his sketches for the work. A TV documentary, Quilty: Painting the Shadows made by filmmaker Catherine Hunter featuring this work and other work by Quilty, was shown on ABC TV in November 2019.

See also
 List of massacres in Australia
List of massacres of Indigenous Australians

References

Further reading 
 
 
  (at Wikisource)
 , foreword by Peter FitzSimons.
  This book is largely a biography of the Attorney General of NSW at the time, John Plunkett. The trial was his greatest test as prosecutor.

External links

 National Heritage Places – Myall Creek Massacre and Memorial Site, Australian Government, Department of the Environment
 The Myall Creek Massacre, Peter Stewart
 Friends of Myall Creek
 "Where can I find information on the Myall Creek Massacre?", National Library of Australia

Conflicts in 1838
Massacres in 1838
Crime in New South Wales
Deaths by firearm in New South Wales
1838 in Australia
Australian National Heritage List
New England (New South Wales)
19th century in New South Wales
Massacres of Indigenous Australians
June 1838 events
Gwydir Shire
Inverell Shire
1830s crimes in Australia